The 12th IAAF World Half Marathon Championships was held on October 4, 2003 in Vilamoura, Portugal. A total of 171 athletes, 98 men and 73 women, from 49 countries took part.
Detailed reports on the event and an appraisal of the results were given both
for the men's race and for the women's race.

Complete results were published for the men's race, for the women's race, for men's team, and for women's team.

Medallists

Race results

Men's

Women's

Team results

Men's

Women's

Participation
The participation of 171 athletes (98 men/73 women) from 49 countries is reported.

 (5)
 (1)
 (3)
 (1)
 (5)
 (1)
 (2)
 (1)
 (1)
 (2)
 (5)
 (2)
 (3)
 (1)
 (4)
 (10)
 (1)
 (8)
 (1)
 (2)
 (1)
 (6)
 (2)
 (9)
 (8)
 (7)
 (2)
 (3)
 (1)
 (1)
 (1)
 (3)
 (1)
 (9)
 (3)
 (1)
 (8)
 (5)
 (5)
 (1)
 (1)
 (6)
 (2)
 (3)
 (4)
 (5)
 (10)
 (2)
 (2)

See also
2003 in athletics (track and field)

References

External links
Official website

IAAF World Half Marathon Championships
Half Marathon Championships
World Athletics Half Marathon Championships
International athletics competitions hosted by Portugal